David Price may refer to:

Military
David Price (East India Company officer) (1762–1835), East India Company officer and orientalist
David Price (Royal Navy officer) (1790–1854), British Rear Admiral at the Siege of Petropavlovsk

Politics 
Sir David Price (British politician) (1924–2014), British Conservative Member of Parliament in the 1970s and 1980s
David Price (Canadian politician) (born 1945), Member of Parliament from Quebec
David Price (American politician) (born 1940), Democratic Congressman representing the 4th district of North Carolina
David Edward Price (1826–1883), Canadian businessman and Senator
David Price-White (1906 - 1978), British Member of Parliament

Sports 
David Price (baseball) (born 1985), pitcher in Major League Baseball
David Price (boxer) (born 1983), British Commonwealth heavyweight champion
David Price (English cricketer) (born 1965), English cricketer
David Price (South African cricketer) (1910–1942), South African cricketer
David Price (footballer, born 1955), English footballer for Arsenal F.C.
David Price (footballer, born 1971), English footballer and coach in the United States
David Price Racing, British auto racing team founded by David Price

Film and TV
David Price (actor) (born 1963), American film and television actor
David Price (Australian actor), Australian actor in All Men Are Liars
David Price (director) (born 1961), American director of Children of the Corn II: The Final Sacrifice and Son of Darkness: To Die For II

Other
David Price (anthropologist) (born 1960), American anthropologist
David Price (British academic) (born 1956), British earth scientist at University College London
David H. Price (historian) (born 1957), professor and author
David Price (musician) (born 1969), British choral conductor and organist
Dave Price (publisher) (born 1962), American journalist
Dave Price (born 1966), reporter
David Price (engineer) (born 1943), former Ford executive, programme manager of the Ford Mondeo, and a former Chairman of Aston Martin
David Price (Welsh Independent minister) (1809–1878), Welsh Independent minister at Aberdare